License plates are displayed on all motorized road vehicles in Brunei, as required by law. The issue of license plates is regulated and administered by the Brunei Land Transport Department.  All vehicles must also display two of the same license plates numbers of the same colours at the front and rear of the vehicles.  All vehicle license plates in Brunei, other than those issued to royalty, diplomats and taxis (see below), have white characters on a black background, regardless of the vehicle type.

Fundamental design

The most common form of Brunei licence plates, in use since the introduction of motorised vehicles in the country's British colonial era, typically begin with one or more letters followed by up to four numerical digits with no leading zeroes. Thus, the configuration of a common Brunei number plate may be in the form of BB 1234. 

Possible license plate combinations range from B 1 to BZZ 9999 or KA 1 to KP 9999. The first letter is either "B" for cars registered with the Brunei-Muara Land Transport Department prior to 2006, or "K" for cars registered with the Kuala Belait Land Transport Department prior to 2006. After 2006, the letter "K" can be assigned to any car irrespective of the location in which the car are registered.  The table below shows special cases & exceptions. Some letters are not used for example: the letters I & O are not used to avoid ambiguity with numbers or other forms of local license plates.

The Land Transport Department started creating license plates with 3 digit alpha prefixes in 2009.

The format is used in virtually all classes of vehicles with engines, including, unless stated later:
 Private vehicles (cars, motorcycles, vans, trucks and other vehicles of similar design).
 Commercial and industrial vehicles (vans, trucks - light or heavy, buses, road-legal vehicles for construction and excavation and other vehicles of similar design).
 Service vehicles (police cars, ambulances, fire engines, public utility vehicles and other vehicles of similar design).

The shape and size of Brunei license plates on vehicles, with the exception of motorcycles and scooters, are restricted to either 8.5 inch by 13.5 incy or 21 inch by 6 inch.  Vehicular plates on motorcycles are usually smaller at either 4.25 inch by 6.75 inch or 8.5 inch by 3 inch.  The size of the letters and numbers on the license plate is defined to be 3.5 inch by 2.5 inch by 0.625 inch for all vehicles except for motorcycles which is defined to be 1.75 inch 2.5 inch by 0.3125 inch.

Special cases

Royal Family
Some of the vehicles of the members of the Brunei Royal Family including the Sultan and the Crown Prince have unique license plates.  Some of the plates have different colours (e.g. white on red), initials or fancy script.

Diplomat car
Number 4 DC Indonesia
XX-NN-DC where XX is a sequential number, NN = foreign mission number (e.g. USA = 9) and DC stands for diplomat's car.  The plates have a white background with black letters and numbers.

Taxis and buses

The numbers for taxis and buses are the same as those for private vehicles, but the plates have a green background instead of black background instead.  The letters and numbers on the plate is white in colour as with private vehicles.

Dealerships

Temporary license plates are given to car dealerships to enable the car to be transported to the showroom, for test drives, etc.  These plates have a white background with red letters and numbers.

Military vehicles

Military vehicles have a white letters/numbers on black background like any private registered cars.  However, the numbering system is different from private vehicles as all military vehicles are registered with a MOD1111x number, where MOD stands for Ministry of Defence, 1111 is the number with any leading zeros being omitted and x is a letter denoting which branch of the military it is registered under.

Foreign Malaysian vehicles

Older Brunei number plates bears similarity to Malaysian state of Selangor and Kedah number plates which also begin with "B" and "K". The newer Brunei number plates has font shape and size that can easily differentiate them from Malaysian registered vehicles.

References

External links 

Transport in Brunei
Brunei
Brunei transport-related lists